This is a list of ecoregions of New Zealand as defined by the World Wide Fund for Nature.

Tropical and subtropical moist broadleaf forests
Kermadec Islands subtropical moist forests
Temperate broadleaf and mixed forests
Chatham Islands temperate forests
Fiordland temperate forests
Nelson Coast temperate forests
North Island temperate forests
Northland temperate kauri forests
Rakiura Island temperate forests
Richmond temperate forests
Southland temperate forests
Westland temperate forests
Temperate grasslands, savannas, and shrublands
Canterbury–Otago tussock grasslands
Montane grasslands and shrublands
Southland montane grasslands
Tundra
Antipodes Subantarctic Islands tundra

 
New Zealand
Ecoregions
Ecoregions